The 1858 Vermont gubernatorial election for governor of Vermont was held on Tuesday, September 7. In keeping with the "Mountain Rule", incumbent Republican Ryland Fletcher was not a candidate for a third one-year term. The Republican nominee was Hiland Hall. The Democratic nominee was Henry Keyes, who was also the Democratic nominee in 1856 and 1857.

Vermont continued to strongly support abolitionism and the Republican Party, and Hall was easily elected. Hall took the oath of office for a one-year term that began on October 14.

General election

Results

References

1858
Vermont
Gubernatorial
October 1858 events